Gawaahi is a 1989 Bollywood film directed by Anant Balani. It was his directorial debut. The film stars Zeenat Aman, Shekhar Kapur, Ranjeeta Kaur and Ashutosh Gowariker. It was based on the 1934 play The Night of January 16th, a courtroom drama by Ayn Rand.

This movie was completed in 12 days.

Synopsis 
A courtroom drama around the disclosures and cross-examinations of key witnesses of mysterious death of leading business tycoon Ranjeet Chaudhary (Shekhar Kapoor).

Cast 
Zeenat Aman as Janhavi Kaul
Tanuja as advocate Bharucha
Shekhar Kapur as Ranjeet Chaudhary
Ranjeeta Kaur as Shashi Chaudhary
Ashutosh Gowariker as Sayed Akhtar Rampuri
Vikram Gokhale as Prosecutor Tiwari
Vivek Vaswani as Tejchand Advani
 Avinash Kharshikar as Ramakant Shinde
Hosi Vasunia as Inspector Vasunia
Shammi (actress) as Betty Lobo
Ravi Patwardhan as Judge
 G.P. Singh as Colonel Ghai
 Rakesh Shrivastav as building watchman
 Gautam Siddharth as handwriting expert

Crew
Director: Anant Balani
Dialogues: Hemendra Bhatia
Producers: Rajiv Mehra, Adityaraj Kapoor

Soundtrack

References

External links

1989 films
Indian films based on plays
Films based on works by Ayn Rand
1980s Hindi-language films
Indian courtroom films
Films directed by Anant Balani